The Popular Alliance for National Integration (Spanish: Alianza Popular de Integración Nacional, APIN) was a right-wing electoral political alliance in Bolivia.

The APIN was formed in 1979 by:
Revolutionary Agrarian Movement of the Bolivian Peasantry, MARC
Bolivian Socialist Falange, FSB (faction led by Mario Gutiérrez Gutiérrez)
Christian Democratic Union, UDC

In 1979 presented as its presidential candidate René Bernal Escalante (MARC) and Mario Gutiérrez Gutiérrez (FSB) as vice-presidential candidate.

Notes

1979 establishments in Bolivia
Conservative parties in Bolivia
Defunct political party alliances in Bolivia
Political parties established in 1979
Political parties with year of disestablishment missing